Selbitz is a village and a former municipality in Wittenberg district in Saxony-Anhalt, Germany. Since 1 January 2010, it is part of the town Kemberg.

Geography 
Selbitz lies about 12 km southwest of Lutherstadt Wittenberg on the edge of the Flusslandschaft Mittlere Elbe biosphere reserve.

History  
Selbitz had its first documentary mention in 1388 under the name Slewitz.

Partnerships 
Selbitz maintains a partnership with the like-named town of Selbitz in Hof district in Bavaria.

Economy and transportation
Federal Highway (Bundesstraße) B 100 between Gräfenhainichen and Coswig is about 10 km away.

References

External links 
Verwaltungsgemeinschaft's website

Former municipalities in Saxony-Anhalt
Kemberg